Alessandro Visone (born 27 January 1987) is an Italian footballer who plays for ASD Anzio Calcio 1924.

Biography

early career
Born in Novi Ligure, in the Province of Alessandria, Piedmont. Visone spent his early career in Serie D teams: Aprilia and Rome teams Astrea and Ostia Mare Lidocalcio.

Lega Pro teams
In July 2007 he was signed by Massese and on 4 January 2008 he was signed by Pescara. After no appearances, he was signed by Barletta. and in October left for Serie D team Arrone. In mid-2009 he was signed by Prima Divisione team Arezzo and in January 2010 loaned to Colligiana. After the bankrupt of Arezzo, he joined Ravenna in 1-year contract. He played 4 times in the league and played once in the cup. On 10 January 2011 he was exchanged with Sergio Carnesalini.

In July 2011 he was signed by Serie A team Parma and farmed to Vigor Lamezia on 24 July. The club did not announce it was a loan or a co-ownership deal.

Later career
In August 2016, Visone joined Cassino. He later had spells at ASD Valle del Tevere, ASD Anzio Calcio 1924 and FBC Gravina, before returning to ASD Anzio Calcio 1924 again in September 2019.

References

External links
 
 Football.it Profile 
 

Italian footballers
U.S. Massese 1919 players
Delfino Pescara 1936 players
A.S.D. Barletta 1922 players
S.S. Arezzo players
A.S.D. Olimpia Colligiana players
Ravenna F.C. players
F.C. Esperia Viareggio players
Vigor Lamezia players
S.F. Aversa Normanna players
A.S.D. Progreditur Marcianise players
A.S.D. Cassino Calcio 1924 players
Serie C players
Serie D players
Association football midfielders
People from Novi Ligure
1987 births
Living people
Footballers from Piedmont
Sportspeople from the Province of Alessandria